"Be Prepared" is a song written by Elton John and Tim Rice (music and lyrics, respectively) for the Disney animated feature film The Lion King (1994). The song was originally performed in the film by Jeremy Irons, with Whoopi Goldberg, Cheech Marin, and Jim Cummings providing supporting vocals; Cummings performed partial material for Scar after Irons' baritone voice gave out.

The song is also featured in the 1997 Broadway musical The Lion King, with John Vickery, Kevin Cahoon, Stanley Wayne Mathis, and Tracy Nicole Chapman performing it in the original Broadway cast for the musical. Chiwetel Ejiofor performed an altered version of the song in the 2019 film adaptation.

The Lion King
The song is performed as a musical number by Scar, who lusts for the position as king of the Pride Lands. Scar plans for both his brother Mufasa and his nephew Simba to be murdered, and he sings to an army of spotted hyenas, asking for their assistance.

Production 
Originally, the song (first called "Thanks to Me") was about Scar introducing the hyenas to the lionesses after he pronounced himself king. This idea was eventually scrapped and replaced with "Be Prepared". A reprise of the song after Mufasa's death was also cut from the film, but is featured in the musical version. In the beginning of the second verse, an army of hyenas is shown goose-stepping in front of Scar, who is perched on an overlooking cliff in resemblance of Adolf Hitler with upwards of 22 beams of light pointing straight-up (resembling the Cathedral of light featured in many of the Nuremberg Rallies). Shadows cast onto the cliff evoke for a brief second monumental columns. This is modeled after footage from Leni Riefenstahl's Nazi propaganda movie Triumph of the Will.

Though Jeremy Irons is credited for performing the lead vocals on the song, at the 2012 Calgary Comic and Entertainment Expo, Jim Cummings, who also played Ed, stated that he sang most of the song, and that Irons only did some of the talking. However, footage from the film's recording sessions available on the film's 2017 Blu-ray release reveals that Irons sang the entire first verse of the song, while a cursory analysis of the recording suggests (due to a subtle but evident shift in vocal timbre heard in Scar's lead vocal) that Cummings only sang the final verse ("So prepare for the coup of the century..." onwards) in the final cut of the film. Cummings has also confirmed this in other interviews, claiming that he sang this last verse due to Irons developing vocal problems during the recording session.

Original recording 
On the original soundtrack recording, Scar opens the song with a soliloquy:

In the film, this is cut and the song begins immediately. This was due to a plot adjustment. The soliloquy had Scar considering using the hyenas for his plot, but in the final version of the story, he had already used the hyenas in his plans before the song. The soliloquy is, however, included in the Broadway version.

Deleted reprises
During early production of the film, there was a reprise created of the song, taking place after Scar has assumed power over the Pride Lands. He is given the idea by Zazu to find a mate. So he tries seducing Nala, who refuses his advances, and is therefore banished by Scar. He then unleashes the hyenas upon the Pride Lands as his "executive staff".  A second version of the reprise was also considered to be sung during Mufasa's funeral (this variation is included as a special supplement on the laserdisc edition of the film and was also featured on the Broadway musical). Both versions of the reprise were ultimately removed from the film and the concept of the first version was later recycled in "The Madness of King Scar" and was included in the Broadway musical version of the film.

The Lion King 1½
In DisneyToon's 2004 direct-to-video film The Lion King 1½, the music from the beginning of the song is briefly heard as Timon and Pumbaa tour Scar's lair as a possible new home, commenting on how it is quiet, secluded and with no uninvited visitors. The shadows of the goose-stepping hyena army are then seen marching in front of them, though they haven't started singing yet. Timon and Pumbaa stare at them for a few seconds, and remark that the hyenas "ain't the traveling company of Riverdance". They then Riverdance out of the scene.

The Lion King (2019)

In April 2019, Favreau confirmed that "Be Prepared" would be one of the songs featured in the 2019 remake of The Lion King. On June 24, 2019, the remake was confirmed to feature a reworked version of the song. In the film proper, Scar (voiced by Chiwetel Ejiofor), performs an abridged version of the song, in a darker tone than that of the 1994 film.

Festival of The Lion King
In Walt Disney World's Animal Kingdom's Festival of the Lion King, Kiume sings the song while the theater takes on a darker tone with the male dancers carrying spears and shields, while the female dancers dance with streamers. After Kiume sings the first verse, the solo hyena performer does a tribal dance with a fire torch. In the finale, when the snippet of "Be Prepared" is sung, the hyena comes back out but dances with blades.

Reception

Original version
The song has garnered positive reactions and reviews. Becky Fuller from Screen Rant gave the song's original version a positive review. He describes the song as "camp, fun, and just scary enough to make younger viewers feel a little on edge" and perfectly summed up Scar's character. He praised Jeremy Irons' performance, citing his deep, baritone tones is perfect for the song.
Glen Weldon from NPR also praised the song as indelible and iconic for its pure expression of Scar's character. Hannah-Rose Yee from Stylist cited Be Prepared as one of the best songs in the film for mixing humor and tragedy in the lyrics that build up the character's deluded aspiration and twisted desire.

2019 remake
The version of the song featured on the remake received a mixed reaction. Fuller criticized the 2019 remake of the song, commenting "it feels like Scar is merely relaying some information to audiences that could have been delivered in a speech" and felt it would have been better if the song is not included at all.
Similarly, Weldon criticized the song for cutting most of the verses, commenting the song sounds more like "if the Boy Scouts imposed martial law" and make Scar's character like "a mere feckless politician attempting to sway a potential ally".

References

External links
 

1994 songs
Songs with lyrics by Tim Rice
Songs with music by Elton John
Songs from The Lion King (franchise)
Disney Renaissance songs
Songs about revenge
Jim Cummings songs